A constitutional referendum was held in Morocco on 15 September 1995. The amendment was made in order to change the date on which the annual Finance Act must be passed. It was approved by 99.6% of voters, with a 70.2% turnout.

Results

References

Morocco
Referendums in Morocco
1995 in Morocco
Constitutional referendums in Morocco